Roger Hudson may refer to:

 Roger Hudson (cricketer) (born 1967), English cricketer
 Roger Hudson (sailor) (born 1978), South African sailor